The Peace Tower is a clock tower of the Canadian Parliament buildings in Ottawa, Canada, built to commemorate the end of World War I.

Peace Tower may also refer to:
 Peace Tower (art), an art installation in Los Angeles, California in 1966 to protest the Vietnam War, recreated in New York City in 2006 to protest the Iraq War
 Imagine Peace Tower, a dedication to John Lennon from his widow Yoko Ono near Reykjavík, Iceland
 The Peace Tower located at the International Peace Garden between North Dakota, United States and Manitoba, Canada
 The Island of Ireland Peace Park in Belgium contains a Peace Tower as a memorial to Irish veterans of World War I
 Tower of Peace is one of three names used for the Lake Placid Tower in Lake Placid, Florida when it was a tourist attraction.
 Peace Tower in Hiroshima Peace Memorial Park, Hiroshima, Japan
 Peace Tower in Heiwadai Park, Miyazaki, Japan
 Peace Tower at Sennaya Square, Saint Petersburg, Russia